, the following species of sea lice are recognised in the family Argulidae:

Argulus O. F. Müller, 1785:

Argulus africanus 
Argulus alexandrensis 
Argulus alosae 
Argulus amazonicus 
Argulus ambloplites 
Argulus ambystoma 
Argulus americanus 
Argulus angelae 
Argulus angusticeps 
Argulus annae 
Argulus appendiculosus 
Argulus arcassonensis 
Argulus australiensis 
Argulus belones 
Argulus bengalensis 
Argulus bicolor 
Argulus boli 
Argulus borealis 
Argulus brachypeltis 
Argulus caecus 
Argulus capensis 
Argulus carteri 
Argulus catostomi 
Argulus cauveriensis 
Argulus celioi 
Argulus chesapeakensis 
Argulus chicomendesi 
Argulus chilensis 
Argulus chinensis 
Argulus chiropteroideus 
Argulus chromidis 
Argulus confusus 
Argulus coregoni 
Argulus cubensis 
Argulus cunningtoni 
Argulus dactylopteri 
Argulus dageti 
Argulus dartevellei 
Argulus diversicolor 
Argulus diversus 
Argulus ellipticaudatus 
Argulus elongatus 
Argulus ernsti 
Argulus exiguus 
Argulus flavescens 
Argulus floridensis 
Argulus fluviatilis 
Argulus foliaceus 
Argulus fryeri 
Argulus funduli 
Argulus fuscus 
Argulus giganteus 
Argulus giordanii 
Argulus gracilis 
Argulus hylae 
Argulus ichesi 
Argulus incisus 
Argulus indicus 
Argulus ingens 
Argulus intectus 
Argulus izintwala 
Argulus japonicus 
Argulus jollymani 
Argulus juparanensis 
Argulus kosus 
Argulus kunmingensis 
Argulus kusafugu 
Argulus laticauda 
Argulus lepidostei 
Argulus longicaudatus 
Argulus lunatus 
Argulus macropterus 
Argulus maculosus 
Argulus maharashtrians 
Argulus major 
Argulus mangalorensis 
Argulus matuii 
Argulus meehani 
Argulus megalops 
Argulus melanostictus 
Argulus melita 
Argulus mexicanus 
Argulus mississippiensis 
Argulus mongolianus 
Argulus monodi 
Argulus moratoi 
Argulus mugili 
Argulus multicolor 
Argulus multipocula 
Argulus nativus 
Argulus nattereri 
Argulus niger 
Argulus nobilis 
Argulus onodai 
Argulus papuensis 
Argulus paranensis 
Argulus parsi 
Argulus patagonicus 
Argulus personatus 
Argulus peruvianus 
Argulus pestifer 
Argulus piperatus 
Argulus plecoglossi 
Argulus poeyi 
Argulus pugettensis 
Argulus puthenveliensis 
Argulus quadristriatus 
Argulus reticulatus 
Argulus rhamdiae 
Argulus rhipidiophorus 
Argulus rijckmansii 
Argulus rotundus 
Argulus rubescens 
Argulus rubropunctatus 
Argulus salminei 
Argulus schoutedeni 
Argulus scutiformis 
Argulus siamensis 
Argulus sindhensis 
Argulus spinulosus 
Argulus stizostethii 
Argulus striatus 
Argulus taliensis 
Argulus tientsinensis 
Argulus trachynoti 
Argulus trilineatus 
Argulus tristramellae 
Argulus varians 
Argulus ventanensis 
Argulus versicolor 
Argulus vierai 
Argulus violaceus 
Argulus vittatus 
Argulus wilsoni 
Argulus ybatecobe 
Argulus yucatanus 
Argulus yuii 
Argulus yunnanensis 

Chonopeltis Thiele, 1900:

Chonopeltis australis 
Chonopeltis brevis 
Chonopeltis congicus 
Chonopeltis elongatus 
Chonopeltis flaccifrons 
Chonopeltis fryeri 
Chonopeltis inermis 
Chonopeltis lisikili 
Chonopeltis liversedgi 
Chonopeltis meridionalis 
Chonopeltis minutus 
Chonopeltis schoutedeni 

Dipteropeltis Callman, 1912:
Dipteropeltis campanaformis Neethling, Oliveira Malta & Avenant-Oldewage, 2014
Dipteropeltis hirundo Calman, 1912

Dolops Audouin, 1837:

Dolops bidentata 
Dolops carvalhoi 
Dolops discoidalis 
Dolops geayi 
Dolops intermedia 
Dolops kollari 
Dolops longicauda 
Dolops nana 
Dolops ranarum 
Dolops reperta 
Dolops striata 
Dolops tasmanianus

References 

Crustaceans
Argulidae